The Ministry of Interior and Territorial Communities is a ministry of the Government of Haiti. An interior ministry, it is mainly responsible for the maintenance of internal security and domestic policy. In addition, the ministry is part of the Prime Minister's Cabinet.

List of ministers
This page lists Interior Ministers of Haiti since 1932.

1932–1934: Elie Lescot
1934–1936: Joseph Titus
1936–1937: Frédéric Duvigneau
1937–1940 : Christian Lanoue
1940: Amilcar Duval
1940–1941: Alfred Nemours
1941: Jean-Chrisostome Lélio-Joseph
1941–1946: Vély Thébaud
1946: Paul Magloire
1946–1948: Georges Honorat
1948–1950: Louis Raymond
1950: Castel Démesmin
1950: Paul Magloire
1950: Luc Fouché
1950–1952: Arsène Magloire
1952–1953: Paracelse Pélissier
1953–1954: Ducasse Jumelle
1954–1955: Luc Prophète
1955–1956: Adelphin Telson
1956: Alphonse Racine
1956–1957: Rodolphe Barau
1957: Thézalus Pierre-Etienne
1957: Léonce Bernard
1957: Gaston Georges
1957–1959: Frédéric Duvigneau
1959: Jean A. Magloire
1959–1961: Aurèle Joseph
1961–1962: Boileau Méhu
1962–1964: Luc D. François
1964–1967: Jean M. Julmé
1967: Morille Figaro
1967–1971: Aurèle Joseph
1971–1972: Luckner Cambronne
1972–1973: Roger Lafontant
1973–1974: Breton Nazaire
1974–1976: Paul Blanchet
1976–1977: Pierre Biamby
1977–1978: Aurélien Jeanty
1978–1979: Achille Salvant
1979: Bertholand Edouard
1979–1980: Claude Raymond
1980–1981: Frantz Médard
1981–1982: Edouard Berrouet
1982: Joseph Alexis Guerrier
1982–1985: Roger Lafontant
1985: François Guillaume
1985: Jean-Marie Chanoine
1985–1986: Pierre Merceron
1986–1988: Williams Régala
1988: Yves Auguste
1988: Williams Régala
1988–1989: Carl Dorsainville
1989: Acédius Saint-Louis
1989–1990: Fritz Romulus
1990–1991: Joseph Maxi
1991: René Préval
1991–1992: Gracia Jean
1992: Serge M. Charles
1992–1993: Carl-Michel Nicholas
1993–1994: René Prosper
1994: Willio Noailles
1994: Carl-Michel Nicholas
1994–1995: René Prosper
1995: Mondésir Beaubrun
1995–1996: Wilthan Lhérisson
1996–1999: Jean-Joseph Molière
1999–2001: Jacques-Édouard Alexis
2001–2002: Henri-Claude Ménard
2002–2004: Jocelerme Privert
2004–2005: Hérard Abraham
2005: Georges Moïse
2005–2006: Gustave Magloire
2006–2011: Paul Antoine Bien-Aimé
2011–2012: Thierry Mayard-Paul
2012–2013: Ronsard Saint-Cyr
2013–2014: David Bazile
2014–2015: Réginald Delva
2015: Ariel Henry
2015–2016: Ardouin Zéphirin
2016: Pierrot Delienne (acting)
2016–2017: François Anick Joseph
2017–2018: Max Rudolph Saint-Albin
2018–2019: Jean-Marie Reynaldo Brunet
2019–2020:  (acting)
2020–2021: Audain Fils Bernadel
2021: Louis Gonzague Edner Day
2021–2022: Liszt Quitel
2022–present: Ariel Henry (acting)

See also
Haiti
List of heads of state of Haiti
Prime Minister of Haiti
List of colonial governors of Saint-Domingue

References

Government ministries of Haiti